Eye Health UK is a national medical association in the UK for the British eyecare industry. It promotes eye health.

History
The Eyecare Information Service was formed in 1994, which became the Eyecare Trust in 2005.

The organisation is the new name for the Eyecare Trust, a charity. The Eyecare Trust was legally formed in November 2000.

The decision to change the name of the charity was taken in June 2016.

Structure
The charity is headquartered in Bath, Somerset. It receives money from the Central Optical Fund,  itself founded in 1972.

See also
 British Contact Lens Association

References

External links
 Eyecare Trust

1994 establishments in the United Kingdom
Eye care in the United Kingdom
Health education in the United Kingdom
Health education organizations
Health in Somerset
Medical associations based in the United Kingdom
Organisations based in Bath, Somerset